Volks-Schillerpreis was a literary prize of Germany awarded by Goethe Federation to:
 1905  Carl Hauptmann, Gerhart Hauptmann and Richard Beer-Hofmann
 1908  Ernst Hardt  
 1913 Herbert Eulenberg.

References

German literary awards